Ruichang is a county-level city under the jurisdiction of Jiujiang, in the north of Jiangxi province, along the Yangtze River, bordering Hubei province to the north.

Ruichang suffered deaths and extensive damage from the 2005 Ruichang earthquake.

Administrative divisions
Ruichang City is divided to 2 subdistricts, 8 towns and 9 townships.
2 subdistricts
 Pencheng
 Guilin

8 towns

9 townships

Transportation
Ruichang is served by the Wuhan–Jiujiang Railway.

Climate

References

External links
 Official website (Chinese)

County-level divisions of Jiangxi
Cities in Jiangxi
Populated places on the Yangtze River
Jiujiang